Xu Chen may refer to:

Sportspeople 
 Xu Chen (徐晨), Chinese badminton player
 Xu Chen (footballer) (徐辰), Chinese association footballer

See also
 Chen Xu (disambiguation)